Urodon is a small genus from the family Fabaceae native to southwestern Australia.

References

Mirbelioids
Fabales of Australia
Rosids of Western Australia
Fabaceae genera
Taxa named by Nikolai Turczaninow